Dual piping is a system of plumbing installations used to supply both potable and reclaimed water to a home or business.  Under this system, two completely separate water piping systems are used to deliver water to the user.  This system prevents mixing of the two water supplies, which is undesirable, since reclaimed water is usually not intended for human consumption.

In the United States, reclaimed water is distributed in lavender (light purple) pipes, to alert users that the pipes contain non-potable water. Hong Kong has used a dual piping system for toilet flushing with sea water since the 1950s.

Further reading 
Tang, S.L., Derek P.T. Yue, Damien C.C. Ku: Engineering and Costs of Dual Water Supply Systems, International Water Supply Association 2007, 

Plumbing